The Tampa Mayhem are an American rugby league team  based in Tampa, Florida.  2014 was their inaugural season in the USA Rugby League.

Current 2022 Squad
Mike Stoeling
Bart Longchamp
Josh Heath
Jethro Hauser
Justin Branca
Cody Blackwell

See also

Rugby league in the United States

References

External links
 Official website
 Facebook page

USA Rugby League teams
Sports teams in Tampa, Florida
2014 establishments in Florida
Rugby clubs established in 2014
Rugby league in Florida